C. chinensis may refer to:
 Calyptraea chinensis, the Chinese hat snail or Chinese hat shell, a small sea snail species found in North-West Africa, in the Mediterranean, the North Sea, the Black Sea and the Atlantic Ocean
 Canna chinensis, a garden plant
 Corylus chinensis, the Chinese filbert or Chinese hazel, a deciduous tree species native to western China
 Cryptocarya chinensis, the Chinese cryptocarya, a medium-sized evergreen tree species native to the subtropical forests of Taiwan, southern China and Japan

See also
 Chinensis (disambiguation)